Samba Carioca is a 2010 album by guitarist and vocalist Vinicius Cantuária.

Music and recording
The album was produced by Arto Lindsay. "While some of the melodies are quintessential bossa fare, the lyrics often have something of the enigmatic beauty of haiku: 'Berlin', for instance, takes a backward glance at the Siegessäule column in the Tiergarten".

Reception
The Independents reviewer described it as "laid-back, drifting samba-jazz". The Sunday Times commented that it "cements his reputation as one of Brazil's finest exports".

Track listing
"Praia Grande" – 5:57
"Berlin" – 5:19
"Vagamente" – 2:52
"Inútil Paisagem" – 4:14	
"Julinha De Botas" – 1:46	
"Fugiu" – 3:35	
"Orla" – 6:39	
"Conversa Fiada" – 4:33	
"So Focou Saudade" – 6:06

Personnel
 Vinicius Cantuária – guitar, vocals, keyboards, drums, percussion
 Dadi, Bill Frisell – guitar
 Jessé Sadoc – flugelhorn
 Joao Donato – piano
Marcos Valle – piano
Brad Mehldau – piano
 Luiz Alves – bass
 Liminha – double bass
 Paulo Braga – acoustic drums
 Sidinho – percussion

References

Naïve Records albums
Vinicius Cantuária albums